The 1995–96 Eastern European Hockey League season, was the first season of the multi-national ice hockey league. Eight teams participated in the league, and HK Neman Grodno of Belarus won the championship.

First round

Final round

Championship round

5th-8th place

External links
Season on hockeyarchives.info

2
Eastern European Hockey League seasons